Ivan Alekseyevich Varlamov (23 October 1937 – 18 August 2020) was a Soviet football player and manager. He was born in Khutorok, Krasnodar Krai.

Honours
 Soviet Cup winner: 1965.

International career
Varlamov played his only game for USSR on 4 November 1964 in a friendly against Algeria.

External links
  Profile

1937 births
2020 deaths
Soviet footballers
Soviet Union international footballers
FC Kuban Krasnodar players
FC Spartak Moscow players
Soviet football managers
FC Spartak Vladikavkaz managers
FC Armavir players
Association football defenders
FC Yenisey Krasnoyarsk players
Sportspeople from Krasnodar Krai